Government Degree College Sambhal is a post graduation college in Sambhal affiliated to M. J. P. Rohilkhand University in Bareilly, India. It is commonly known as राजकीय महाविद्यालय सम्भल. It offers undergraduate and postgraduate courses in science, arts, and commerce. It is one of the main degree colleges in the city. The college was established in 2005 with graduation in B.A. and B.Com. After some years, the college started offering B.Sc., M.A. and M.Com. classes.

History
The college was established in 2005 by the government of Uttar Pradesh with the great effort of Ram Gopal Yadav, then The member of parliament from Sambhal (Lok Sabha constituency). Social worker Parvez Khan Donated His 2.597 Hactair Land to the college. In July 2005, Arts and Commerce classes were started. In 2008, the construction of building of college was completed and science classes also started. In 2014, post graduation classes of Commerce and Arts (Hindi, Sociology, Political Science & Economics) were also started.

Campus
It also has a seminar room. The college maintains a playground and a sports complex. Basketball, cricket, and table tennis are organised under the supervision of the Director of Physical Education. The college has well equipped physics, chemistry and Biology laboratories, and NSS rooms.

Library
The college has library room.

Hostel
The college has a boy hostel. The hostel provides residential facilities to undergraduate and postgraduate male students.

Courses
The college gives degrees in 
Bachelor of Arts (B.A.),
Bachelor of Commerce (B.Com),
Bachelor of Science (B.Sc),
Master of Arts (M.A.) and
Master of Commerce (M.Com)

The college has offered three years degree courses (T.D.C.) such

Undergraduate courses
Hindi
English
History
Economics
Sociology
Political science
Commerce
Physics
Chemistry
Methematics
Zoology
Botany

Postgraduate courses
Hindi
Economics
Sociology
Political Science
Commerce

See also
Bareilly College
Hindu Degree College, Moradabad
Mahatma Gandhi Memorial Post Graduate College
Madrasa Sirajul Uloom Hilali Sarai Sambhal
Hind Inter College, Sambhal

References

Universities and colleges in Uttar Pradesh
Education in Sambhal
2005 establishments in Uttar Pradesh
Educational institutions established in 2005